Michael J. Collier (born September 12, 1953) is a former professional American football running back in the National Football League. He played for the Pittsburgh Steelers for two seasons and three with the Buffalo Bills. He played college football at Morgan State.

As a rookie in 1975, he scored three rushing touchdowns while the Steelers went on to win Super Bowl X. He spent the 1976 season on injured reserve (during which he taught physical education at the Talmudical Academy - Yeshiva Chofetz Chaim in Baltimore, Maryland) before signing with the Bills the following year.

He now resides in Hagerstown, Maryland with his two children, his wife Lisa, one granddaughter and works at a local Martin's grocery store as a manager.

References 

1953 births
Living people
Players of American football from Baltimore
American football running backs
Morgan State Bears football players
Pittsburgh Steelers players
Buffalo Bills players